I Like You may refer to:
"I Like You" (Phyllis Nelson song), 1985
"I Like You (A Happier Song)" by Post Malone, 2022
I Like You (A Lot), a 1999 album by Ralph Carney
I Like You (TV series), a South Korean series also known as Only Because It's You